The All Peoples' Association was a voluntary organisation to foster international amity, established in London in 1930 by Sir Evelyn Wrench, founder of the English-Speaking Union and Royal Overseas League.

Membership was organised as national clubs offering evening lectures, libraries, magazines and language courses. Membership in one country's club automatically conferred membership of the worldwide organisation.

The APA particularly attempted to foster Anglo-German understanding in the 1930s, but this became increasingly untenable as World War II approached, and it went bankrupt in 1936.

References
The APA: new home in London, The Times, Wednesday, Feb 14, 1934
Law Notices, The Times, Tuesday, Oct 05, 1937
Sir Evelyn Wrench, Obituary, The Times, Saturday, Nov 12, 1966

1930 establishments in the United Kingdom
1936 disestablishments in the United Kingdom
Mutual organizations
Organizations established in 1930
Organizations disestablished in 1936
1930s in the United Kingdom
Clubs and societies in the United Kingdom